Bréau-Mars is a commune in the Gard department in southern France. It was established on 1 January 2019 by merger of the former communes of Bréau-et-Salagosse (the seat) and Mars.

See also
Communes of the Gard department

References

Communes of Gard
Populated places established in 2019
2019 establishments in France